Carlo Clemente (2 April 1903 – 18 May 1944) was an Italian javelin thrower who competed at the 1924 Summer Olympics.

References

External links
 

1903 births
1944 deaths
Athletes (track and field) at the 1924 Summer Olympics
Italian male javelin throwers
Olympic athletes of Italy